Anti-homelessness may refer to:
 Attempts to help homeless people overcome the problem of homelessness
 Discrimination against the homeless
 Anti-homelessness legislation, which includes both legislation intended to support and rehouse the homeless and legislation that criminalizes the homeless  
 For anti-homelessness organizations, see List of organizations opposing homelessness